Hannibal George Najjar (born October 1953) is a Trinidadian retired football player and manager.

References

External links
 
 

1953 births
Living people
Trinidad and Tobago footballers
Trinidad and Tobago football managers
University of the West Indies alumni
Lindenwood University alumni
UMSL Tritons coaches
Trinidad and Tobago national football team managers
Trinidad and Tobago expatriate footballers
Trinidad and Tobago expatriate football managers
Expatriate soccer players in Canada
Expatriate soccer managers in Canada
Trinidad and Tobago expatriate sportspeople in Canada
Expatriate soccer managers in the United States
Trinidad and Tobago expatriate sportspeople in the United States